The 40th Karlovy Vary International Film Festival took place from 1 to 9 July 2005. The Crystal Globe was won by My Nikifor, a Polish drama film directed by Krzysztof Krauze. The second prize, the Special Jury Prize was won by What a Wonderful Place, an Israeli drama film directed by Eyal Halfon. English film director and screenwriter Michael Radford was the Grand Jury President of the festival.

Juries
The following people formed the juries of the festival: 
Main competition
 Michael Radford, Grand Jury President (UK)
 Frédéric Fonteyne (Belgium)
 Ali MacGraw (USA)
 Fernando Méndez - Laite Serrano (Spain)
 Kornél Mundruczó (Hungary)
 Ruba Nadda (Canada)
 Zuzana Stivínová (Czech Republic)
Documentaries
 David Fisher, Chairman (Israel)
 John Appel (Netherlands)
 Flavia de la Fuente (Argentina)
 Jana Hádková (Czech Republic)
 Ninos Fenec Mikelides (Greece)
East of the West
 Andrej Plachov, Chairman (Russia)
 Jannike Åhlund (Sweden)
 Mira Erdevicki (UK)
 Viera Langerová (Slovenia)
 Roland Rust (Germany)

Official selection awards
The following feature films and people received the official selection awards:
 Crystal Globe (Grand Prix) - My Nikifor (Mój Nikifor) by Krzysztof Krauze (Poland)
 Special Jury Prize - What a Wonderful Place (Eize makom nifla) by Eyal Halfon (Israel)
 Best Director Award - Krzysztof Krauze for My Nikifor (Poland)
 Best Actress Award - Krystyna Feldman for My Nikifor (Poland)
 Best Actor Award (ex aequo):
 Luca Zingaretti for Come into the Light (Alla luce del sole) (Italy)
 Uri Gavriel for What a Wonderful Place (Eize makom nifla) (Israel)
 Special Jury Mention: Noriko's Dinner Table (Noriko no shokutaku) by Sion Sono (Japan)

Other statutory awards
Other statutory awards that were conferred at the festival:
 Best documentary film (over 30 min.) - Estamira by Marcos Prado (Brazil)
 Special mention - Mad Hot Ballroom by Marilyn Agrelo
 Best documentary film (under 30 min.) - Boža moj by Galina Adamovich (Belarus)
 East of the West Award - Ragin by Kirill Serebrennikov (Russia / Austria)
 Special Mention - The Wedding (Wesele) by Wojtek Smarzowski (Poland)
 Crystal Globe for Outstanding Artistic Contribution to World Cinema - Robert Redford, Liv Ullmann, Sharon Stone
 Audience Award - La vie avec mon père by Sébastien Rose (Canada)

Non-statutory awards
The following non-statutory awards were conferred at the festival:
 FIPRESCI International Critics Award: Chinaman (Kinamand), by Henrik Ruben Genz (China / Denmark)
 Don Quixote Award: Noriko No Shokutaku (Japan), by Sion Sono
 Ecumenical Jury Award: Chinaman (Kinamand), by Henrik Ruben Genz (China / Denmark)
 Young Czech Critics Award: The Butterflies Are Just a Step Behind (Parvaneha  mikonand), by Mohammad Ebrahim Moaiery (Iran)
 Czech TV Award (Independent Camera): Los muertos, by Lisandro Alonso (Argentina)

References

2005 film awards
Karlovy Vary International Film Festival